The Journey is a long-form instrumental jazz album composed and led by South African pianist Abdullah Ibrahim (also known as "Dollar Brand") after his move to New York City. This studio recording was made the day after the 17 September 1977 Alice Tully Hall concert pictured on the cover and included other veterans of Ibrahim's group Universal Silence: Don Cherry, Johnny Dyani, and Carlos Ward.

Release and reception

Ibrahim had released Cape Town Fringe earlier in the year, and while that album's African folk roots remain, the addition of many leading-edge New York jazzmen made The Journey a much more avant-garde affair. The short "Sister Rose" begins things,  a "sprightly calypso" suffused with the sound of Ibrahim's native Cape Town. Two lengthy improvisations follow—the first, "Jabulani", features an energetic rhythm section, soaring trumpet work, and atonal group playing. The 22-minute closer "Hajj (The Journey)" is a Middle Eastern–flavored work centered around a hypnotic piano riff, originally from "Eighty-First Street" on Ibrahim's 1968 album Hamba Khale! (with Gato Barbieri).

Track listing
All tracks written by Abdullah Ibrahim.

"Sister Rosie" – 4:33
"Jabulani (Joy)" – 17:38
"Hajj (The Journey)" – 21:56

Personnel
Abdullah Ibrahim – piano, soprano saxophone
Hamiet Bluiett – baritone saxophone, clarinet
Don Cherry – trumpet
Talib Rhynie – alto saxophone, oboe
Carlos Ward – alto saxophone
Johnny Akhir Dyani – bass
Claude Jones – conga drums
John Betsch – percussion
Roy Brooks – percussion

References

1977 albums
Abdullah Ibrahim albums